Deh-e Sukhteh (also Romanized as Deh-e Sūkhteh; also known as Deh-e Sūkhteh Monj) is a village in Manj Rural District, Manj District, Lordegan County, Chaharmahal and Bakhtiari Province, Iran. At the 2006 census, its population was 282, in 56 families. The village is populated by Lurs.

References 

Populated places in Lordegan County
Luri settlements in Chaharmahal and Bakhtiari Province